The Illinois Holocaust Museum and Education Center is a museum located in Skokie, Illinois, near Chicago. According to the Center's mission statement, its founding principle is to "Remember the Past; Transform the Future." Its mission is to preserve the legacy of the Holocaust by honoring victims' memories and to educate in the service of combating hatred, prejudice and indifference. The Museum fulfills its mission through its collections-based exhibitions and through education programs and other initiatives that promote human rights and the elimination of genocide.

History

The museum began in 1981 as the Holocaust Memorial Foundation of Illinois located in a  storefront on Main Street in Skokie, Illinois. The foundation and small museum were established as a response to a Neo-Nazi group's attempt to march through Skokie, in which many Holocaust survivors had settled in the decades following the atrocities.

On April 19, 2009, the  museum opened to the public in a new building with festivities including a keynote speech by Bill Clinton with Elie Wiesel in attendance. President Barack Obama spoke through a recorded video message, as did Shimon Peres, president of Israel.

Security arrangements at the museum were tightened after the United States Holocaust Memorial Museum shooting on June 10, 2009. Currently, the museum's volunteers include members of the Action Reconciliation Service for Peace and the Austrian Holocaust Memorial Service (since 2009) that work for the museum.

Take a Stand Center
In 2017, the museum opened the Take a Stand Center, four interactive galleries located within the space of the museum that include interactive Holograms of Holocaust survivors. Connected to the holograph theater is an exhibit concerning organizations and individuals that have promoted human rights including the Universal Declaration of Human Rights, and such figures as Ruby Bridges and Malala Yousafzai.

Architecture

The museum's building was designed by Stanley Tigerman. The Interior and Exhibition was co-designed by Yitzchak Mais, a former director of Yad Vashem. The first floor Holocaust exhibition is located next to the auditorium, the main entrance hall, information and membership desks, coatroom, gift shop, and library.

The upper floor contains the remembrance areas, the art gallery, the upper part of the auditorium, and offices. The basement contains classrooms, an exhibition for children, an exhibition on the building's history, and a conference area.

The building's facade is notably two toned, a black half that includes the entrance doors and a white half with the exit doors. This facade is located in a narrow alley and situated so that one cannot view the entire facade from any one location.

Location and access

The museum is located in the northwest corner of Skokie, west of the Edens Expressway (I-94). The nearest exit is Old Orchard Road. To the east of the museum is also an abandoned railroad right of way. This right of way is considered for a new CTA Yellow Line extension, with a new terminal station in the proximity of the museum. The museum is already accessible through several bus lines nearby: CTA lines 205 and 54A, and Pace lines 208 and 422.

See also
 History of the Jews in Chicago

References 

Gavriel D. Rosenfeld, "Skokie Builds to Remember,” The Forward, April 24, 2009.

External links 
 Illinois Holocaust Museum and Education Center

See also 
 Spertus Institute for Jewish Learning and Leadership:  Jewish educational and cultural center in Chicago

Museums established in 1981
Skokie, Illinois
Museum education
Skokie Controversy
Jews and Judaism in Chicago
Holocaust museums in the United States
Museums in Cook County, Illinois
Jewish museums in Illinois
2009 establishments in Illinois
1981 establishments in Illinois